The Singatse Range is a mountain range in Lyon County, Nevada.

They form one side of the Mason Valley.

References 

Mountain ranges of Nevada
Mountain ranges of the Great Basin
Mountain ranges of Lyon County, Nevada